The Schiltach–Schramberg railway line was a railway line in Germany. At one time, the line branched off at Schiltach from the Kinzig Valley Railway (Black Forest). The line connected the City of Schramberg to the international railway system.

This line was opened in 1892, but closed to passenger service in 1959 and ceased operations completely in 1990. At Schiltach station a Uerdingen railbus rake and the old railway bridge over the Kinzig recalls this branch that, today, has been  dismantled at 95%.

The line is now used as a bicycle path.

References

External links 
 Bahnstrecke Schramberg - Schiltach

Railway lines in Baden-Württemberg
Rottweil (district)
Railway lines in the Black Forest
Railway lines opened in 1892
Railway lines closed in 1990